Marcus Amerman is a Choctaw bead artist, glass artist, painter, fashion designer, and performance artist, living in Idaho. He is known for his highly realistic beadwork portraits.

Background
Marcus Amerman was born in Phoenix, Arizona in 1959 but grew up in the Pacific Northwest. At the age of 10, his aunt taught him the techniques for Native American beadwork. He earned his Bachelor of Fine Arts from Whitman College in Walla Walla, Washington. He also studied the Institute of American Indian Arts and the Anthropology Film Center.

Artwork

His exploration of so many different genres of art overlap each other. For instance, Amerman's beadwork is integrated into clothing design. His outfits are featured in his performance art. His paintings and glasswork use a vivid palette that is found in his beadwork. He has even create giant beads out of glass.

Amerman's first foray into realism in beadwork was his 1993 Iron Horse Jacket, a studded leather jacket featuring a highly detailed and modeled image of Brooke Shields in beadwork. Later, he added portrait bracelets to his repertoire. He has portrayed many historical heroes in his beadwork, such as Lloyd Kiva New; as well a pop icons, such as Janet Jackson, and imagery inspired by comic superheroes is a current running throughout his work.

His paintings are expressive and often reflect his Choctaw roots, with Mississippian imagery. His work in glass also includes Mississippian ceramic designs, but more often reflects contemporary designs, such as globes of the earth.

Honors
Amerman's work is in such public collections as the George Gustav Heye Center, the National Museum of the American Indian, the American Museum of Natural History, the Heard Museum, the Portland Art Museum, the Sequoyah National Research Center in Little Rock, Arkansas, and the Museum of Arts and Design. He is the only artist to have his beadwork featured in Playboy magazine.

In 2008, Amerman was a Hauberg Fellow at the Pilchuck Glass School and artist-of-residence there in 2008. In 2014 he was awarded a USA Fellow, an award supported by the Rasmuson Foundation. He and Tlingit artist Preston Singletary both taught at the school in 2006 as part of Iconoglass.

Personal
Amerman's brother, Roger Amerman, is also an award-winning beadworker, inspired by Southeastern Woodland designs. Their first cousin, Linda Lomahaftewa is renowned for her printmaking and painting, as was her brother and Amerman's cousin, the late Dan Lomahaftewa. Amerman lives on the Nez Perce Indian Reservation in Kooshia, Idaho with his elderly parents.

Quote
Traditionally, Indians embraced new materials with which to create and new ideas to express.

External links
 Marcus Amerman, official site
 Marcus Amerman, School of American Research
 Marcus Amerman, Vision Project
 "The Universe of Marcus Amerman," The Magazine via Santa Fe.com

References

1959 births
Living people
Artists from Phoenix, Arizona
Choctaw Nation of Oklahoma people
Native American bead artists
Native American sculptors
Native American painters
Native American performance artists
Whitman College alumni
American glass artists
Institute of American Indian Arts alumni
Indigenous fashion designers of the Americas
Sculptors from Arizona
Sculptors from Mississippi
20th-century Native Americans
21st-century Native Americans
Native American people from Arizona